The 2011–12 season is the tenth season in FC Vaslui's existence, and its seventh in a row in Liga I. Though finished third last season, FC Vaslui qualified for the Third qualifying round in UEFA Champions League, following FC Timişoara's relegation.

First-team squad

 T=Total
 L=Liga I
 C=Cupa României
 I=UEFA Europa League, Intertoto UEFA Cup

Transfers

Summer

In

Out

Winter

In

Out

Statistics

Appearances and goals
Last updated on 20 May 2012.

|-
|colspan="12"|Players sold or loaned out during the season
|-

|}

Top scorers

Top Assisters

Disciplinary record

Overall

{|class="wikitable"
|-
|Games played || 49 (34 Liga I, 2 UEFA Champions League, 8 UEFA Europa League, 5 Cupa României)
|-
|Games won || 27 (22 Liga I, 2 UEFA Europa League, 3 Cupa României)
|-
|Games drawn ||  8 (4 Liga I, 1 UEFA Champions League, 3 UEFA Europa League)
|-
|Games lost || 14 (8 Liga I, 1 UEFA Champions League, 3 UEFA Europa League, 2 Cupa României)
|-
|Goals scored || 82
|-
|Goals conceded || 45
|-
|Goal difference || +37
|-
|Yellow cards || 139
|-
|Red cards || 6
|-
|Worst discipline ||  Zhivko Milanov  with 14 yellow cards and 2 red cards
|-
|Best result || 8-0 (H) v Voinţa Livezile – Cupa României – 22 Sep 2011
|-
|Worst result || 0-3 (A) v Rapid – Liga I – 22 Jul 2011
|-
|Most appearances ||  Lucian Sânmărtean with 45 appearances
|-
|Top scorer ||  Wesley (37 goals)
|-
|Points || 70/102 (68.62.%)
|-

Performances
Updated to games played on 20 May 2012.

Goal minutes
Updated to games played on 20 May 2012.

Liga I

The fixtures for the 2011–12 season were announced on 7 July, with an early Liga I title contender clash against Rapid București in the opening match, for the second year in a row.

On 22 July, Vaslui travelled to București to suffer a 0–3 defeat in the Liga I opening match. Two goals from Ciprian Deac and Romeo Surdu and a late goal from Ovidiu Herea saw the club starting the season from the last place in the league. Zhivko Milanov also received the first red card of the season, identical with the opening match from the previous season. Since Rapid's stadium was suspended for the incidents created by fans during the last match of the 2010–11 season, the match was played on Regie.

Vaslui played their first home league match against new promoted team Petrolul Ploieşti on 30 July. The match finished 0–0, most notable being Wesley's captain appointment, following Gabriel Cânu's long-term injury from the UEFA Champions League's qualifying match against FC Twente.

On 14 August, Vaslui faced Concordia Chiajna on its third match. Wesley took the lead with a header in the 33rd minute, managing Vaslui's first goal from the 2011–12 campaign. However, he was substituted three minutes before the end of the first half due to an injury. With two late goals from Silviu Bălace and Denis Zmeu, Vaslui managed its first win from the new season. It was also striker Ionuţ Balaur's debut as a central defender, since both Paul Papp and Gabriel Cânu were injured.

One week later, Vaslui faced a third new promoted team Ceahlăul Piatra Neamţ. The game was goal-less at half-time, with both teams having trouble to find the net. Slowly Vaslui started building confidence, and finally a goal by Mike Temwanjera from a cross by Nemanja Milisavljević put Vaslui ahead in the score. However, two unexpected late goals from Ceahlăul's Eugeniu Cebotaru and Vlad Achim led to a 2–1 defeat, counting Vaslui's second loss in the league.

After a successful qualification in the UEFA Europa League group stages, Vaslui travelled to the Silviu Ploeşteanu Stadium in Braşov to take on the local team, on 28 August. The hosts took the lead in the 31st minute, when Marian Cristescu fed Alexandru Chipciu inside the box and the winger scored with a right-footed strike towards the left corner of Černiauskas's goal. Brasov's joy didn't last too long, since Gerlem equalized one minute later after he dribbled Majerník and put the ball past Felgueiras. In the 56th minute, Wesley played the ball through for Temwanjera, who beat Felgueiras with a low shot into the bottom corner, putting Vaslui ahead. The game eventually ended 2–1, Vaslui winning for the first time in their history on Braşov's home ground.

League table

Results summary

Results by round

Matches

Friendlies
The Austria training camp

The Antalya training camp

Liga I

UEFA Champions League

Third qualifying round

UEFA Europa League

Play-off round

Group stage

Cupa României

Awards

References

FC Vaslui seasons
Vaslui
Vaslui